Gongylidia (singular gongylidium) are hyphal swellings of fungus cultivated by higher-attine genera of fungus-growing ants.  This fungus no longer exists naturally outside the ant colonies.

Developing larvae feed on the gongylidia and distributed throughout the colony to feed workers, soldiers, and the queen. They are ellipsoid, about 30-50 micrometres in diameter, rich in lipids and carbohydrates derived from the leaves, and are produced in clusters (called staphylae).

See also
Pearl body
Leucoagaricus gongylophorus

References

Fungal morphology and anatomy
Myrmecology